Numbers is the third studio album released by country music artist Jason Michael Carroll. It is Carroll's first album since he split up with Arista Nashville. It was released on July 25, 2011, exclusively through Cracker Barrel stores.

Content
The first single from the album was the title track, which was the only song on the album Carroll did not write or co-write. With a peak of number 60 on the Billboard Hot Country Songs charts, the song became the first single of Carroll's career to miss the top 40. Also included on the album is "Alyssa Lies," a number 5 hit from his debut album Waitin' in the Country.

Track listing
The track listing was announced by Cracker Barrel on March 28, 2011.

Chart performance

Album

Singles

References

Jason Michael Carroll albums
2011 albums
Cracker Barrel albums